Satranala decussilvae is a species of flowering plant in the Arecaceae family. It is a palm endemic to Madagascar. It is the only species in the genus Satranala, and is threatened by habitat loss. There are perhaps 200 mature individuals remaining.

References

Coryphoideae
Monotypic Arecaceae genera
Endemic flora of Madagascar
Endangered plants
Taxonomy articles created by Polbot
Taxa named by Henk Jaap Beentje
Taxa named by John Dransfield